"Tishomingo Blues" is a song by Spencer Williams. The tune was first published in 1917. The title refers to Tishomingo, Mississippi.

The song was first recorded in 1918 by Eddie Nelson on Emerson Records #913. It became a jazz standard, and continues to be performed and recorded into the 21st century.  The song has been adapted with different lyrics, written by Garrison Keillor, as the theme song of A Prairie Home Companion.

Lyrics
First verse

Chorus

Second verse

Repeat Chorus

Recordings 
Eddie Nelson, Emerson Records #913, https://www.youtube.com/watch?v=ZVg13XeTPH8, 1918
Duke Ellington and his Cotton Club Orchestra, 1928
Bunk Johnson and his New Orleans Band, 1945
Big Chief Jazzband, recorded in Oslo, Norway on May 10, 1953 and released on the 78 rpm record His Master's Voice A.L. 3307
Sweet Emma Barret and her New Orleans Boys, 1961, with Percy Humphrey (trumpet); Willie Humphrey, clarinet; Jim Robinson, trombone; Emma Barrett, piano; Emanual Sayles, guitar; McNeal Breaux, bass; Josiah Frazier, drums

References

1917 songs
Songs written by Spencer Williams
Songs about Mississippi